The RS-27 (?) or SS-X-32Zh (?) Barguzin BZhRK (БЖРК) Project is a rail-mobile intercontinental ballistic missile (ICBM) under development for the Russian RVSN, as a replacement of the previous railway missile train  Molodets BZhRK SS-24 Scalpel. BZhRK stands for railway strategic missile train. The missile was expected to enter testing in 2019 and enter service in 2020.

The Barguzin “railroad combat complex", or BZhRK, will be armed with six RT-## (the missile will be based on Yars, Bulava, RT-23MU, Rubezh Avangard, maybe partially from RT20PUZh, R-39 Rif and R-39M developments) ICBMs, a fifty-five-ton missile that reportedly carries up to 4 nuclear warheads, and is already deployed in fixed silos and mobile truck-mounted launchers. There will be five railroad missile regiments, each consisting of one train and six ballistic missiles. Operational deployment is slated for 2020.

Unlike its decommissioned Soviet counterpart, the RT-23 Molodets (the SS-24 Mod-3 Scalpel), the new train carrying ICBMs will be much lighter, due to the use of the more compact RS-24 Yars ICBM, so that distinguishing it from an ordinary freight train will be impossible.

In December 2017, the Russian state media reported that the project has been frozen due to a lack of financing, saying that the weapon was too expensive. However, the report also states that the project can be quickly revived if necessary.

See also
 Strategic Missile Troops
 RT-23 Molodets
 RS-24 Yars
 RS-26 Rubezh
 RS-28 Sarmat
 R-36 (missile)
 UR-100N
 RT-2PM Topol
 RT-2PM2 Topol-M
 Agni-VI
 Peacekeeper Rail Garrison Car
 LGM-30 Minuteman
 DF-5
 DF-41

References

External links
 http://www.globalsecurity.org/wmd/world/russia/rs-24-barguzin.htm

Intercontinental ballistic missiles of Russia
Strategic Rocket Forces
Votkinsk Machine Building Plant products
Moscow Institute of Thermal Technology products
Railway weapons